Iraq competed at the 2004 Summer Olympics in Athens, Greece, from 13 to 29 August 2004.

Athletics

Iraqi athletes have so far achieved qualifying standards in the following athletics events (up to a maximum of 3 athletes in each event at the 'A' Standard, and 1 at the 'B' Standard).

Men

Women

Boxing

Iraq sent one boxer to the 2004 Summer Olympics.

Football

Men's tournament

Roster

Group play

Quarterfinal

Semifinal

Bronze Medal Final

Judo

Swimming

Men

Taekwondo

Iraq has qualified one taekwondo jin.

Weightlifting

Iraq has qualified one weightlifter.

See also
 Iraq at the 2004 Summer Paralympics

References

External links
Official Report of the XXVIII Olympiad
National Olympic Committee of Iraq

Nations at the 2004 Summer Olympics
2004
Summer Olympics